Glommersträsk is a locality situated in Arvidsjaur Municipality, Norrbotten County, Sweden, with 272 inhabitants in 2010.

References

External links

Populated places in Arvidsjaur Municipality
Lapland (Sweden)